Hoxa may refer to:

Hoxa, one of the four clusters in which Hox genes are arranged in higher vertebrates, or one of the following genes associated with it:
HOXA9
HOXA11
HOXA11-AS1 (gene)
HOXA13
HOXA, the Hazaribagh Old Xaverians Association, the official alumni organization for St. Xavier's School in Hazaribagh, Jharkhand, India
Hoxa, Orkney, settlement on South Ronaldsay in the Orkney Islands

See also
Enver Hoxha (1908-1985), Communist leader of Albania from 1944 to 1985